Flint Creek may refer to:

Watercourses
Flint Creek (Alabama)
Flint Creek (Arkansas/Oklahoma)
Flint Creek (New York)

Towns
Flint Creek, Oklahoma

Other uses 

 Flint Creek Range, mountain range in Montana
 Flint Creek Water Park, a waterpark in Mississippi
 Flint Creek Farm, an historic farm in Minnesota